Egil Pettersen (4 March 1922 – 27 November 2010) was a Norwegian philologist.

He was born in Bergen and grew up in Fana. He took the cand.philol. degree in 1950, and was a lecturer at Stockholm University, teacher at Bergen Handelsgymnasium and Bergen Teachers' College. He was hired at the University of Bergen in 1958, and was a professor of North Germanic languages from 1971 to 1989, being a scholar on medieval language. He was a member of the Norwegian Language Council from 1972 to 1991, and of the Norwegian Academy of Science and Letters.

References

1922 births
2010 deaths
Academic staff of the University of Bergen
Norwegian philologists
Members of the Norwegian Academy of Science and Letters
Norwegian expatriates in Sweden